Tides is the first studio album by California-based worship collective Bethel Music, it is also the sixth album overall to be released. The album was released on September 3, 2013 by the group's imprint label, Bethel Music. Daniel Mackenzie and Gabriel Wilson produced the album together.

Background
Brian Johnson had an interview with Marcus Hathcock, the editor-in-chief of NewReleaseToday. When Hathcock questioned him about how the album's title and the imagery of the album cover came about, he responded saying:
I didn't arrive at it, actually. Some of our team members did. Actually I had a dream, though. I had a dream about turning tides. A lot of it, though, has to do with the season we're in. There's been a lot of coming, a lot of going with people—a totally different, shifting kind of season. I guess that's the creative way of saying what that season was. We had the idea last-minute to take the whole team to the coast and do the photo shoot at the water.

 – Brian Johnson, NewReleaseToday

In an interview with Sharefaith Magazine, Jenn Johnson spoke of the album having its origins in an encounter she had on a mountaintop, saying:
I had an encounter with the Lord on a mountaintop. I had been in a kind of a fog, just struggling to gain a breakthrough with some things. It was a difficult time. Ministry is fun, but can also be a challenge. I went on to this mountain and spoke to the Lord: 'God I know you're with me, but please come closer. Let me feel you; let me know what to do.' ... He sorted me out, He gave me clarity. I went from just knowing he was with me, to being able to feel him with everything I am.

 – Jenn Johnson, Sharefaith Magazine
Jenn Johnson went on to add that the experience birthed the song "I Can Feel You".

Singles
The song "Chasing You", featuring Jenn Johnson's vocals, impacted Christian radio on September 6, 2013 as the lead single of the album.

Critical reception

David Jeffries, giving the album three and a half stars at AllMusic, states that the album allows for "more electro tones and synthetic sounds,". Julia Kitzing, reviewing the album for CM Addict whilst rating it four stars, says, "The album features songs that offer adoration, instruction, and worship. The songs speak about not only what God has done but what He is doing both in the high and low tides of life. There is something for everyone on this album." At Cross Rhythms, A.T. Bradford rated the album seven squares out of ten, concluding that "All in all, a reasonable though not particularly outstanding set from the renowned Redding, California church." Jonathan Andre, indicating in a three star review at Indie Vision Music, says, "Bethel’s first studio album is a great way to start off with Bethel if you haven’t listened to them before (or even if you have)," and goes on to conclude in a congratulatory manner, "Well done Bethel for such a prolific and powerful album!" Rating the album four stars by Jesus Freak Hideout, Drew Creal thinks that "For a worship record, Tides is incredibly innovative" and concludes that "Bethel places a firm flag in the ground with Tides, reshaping and redefining again what is possible with a worship record." Awarding the album four and a half stars from Louder Than The Music, Jono Davies writes, "The whole album has great worshipful lyrics that dig deep into the soul." Kevin Davis of NewReleaseToday was superbly positive to the album and rated it four and a half stars. He exclaimed that "I'm impressed by the consistent quality and fresh worshipful songs that come from Bethel Music. This album is no exception. Tides is about proclaiming the majesty of God and crying out for His Presence throughout this incredible worship experience."

Accolades
The song, "Forever" which featured Brian Johnson's vocals, was No. 10 on the Worship Leader's Top 20 Worship Songs of 2013 list.

Commercial performance
Tides was the first album by Bethel Music to reach No. 1 on Billboard Christian Albums chart and also peaked at No. 30 on Billboard 200 chart, with nearly 15,000 copies sold as at September 11, 2013. Concurrently, the single, "Chasing You", which featured Jenn Johnson's vocals, was also one of the most downloaded digital Christian singles with 4,000 copies of the song sold.

Track listing

Tides: The Streaming EP

On November 21, 2013, Bethel Music released Tides: The Streaming EP, an extended play on streaming media platforms. The EP only has the first four songs that are found on the full-length album.

Personnel 
Adapted from AllMusic.

Singers
 Steffany Gretzinger – vocals
 Kalley Heiligenthal – backing vocals
 Brian Johnson – vocals 
 Ran Jackson – backing vocals
 Jenn Johnson – vocals
 Daniel Mackenzie – backing vocals 
 Graham Moore – backing vocals
 Jeremy Riddle – vocals 
 Matt Stinton – vocals 
 Hunter Thompson – vocals 
 Gabriel Wilson – backing vocals

Musicians
 Daniel Mackenzie – pianos, programming, bass, drones
 Gabriel Wilson – pianos, guitars, percussion, drones
 Chris Greely – electric guitars
 Michael Pope – electric guitars, hi-string guitar
 Bobby Strand – electric guitars
 Brandon Aaronson – bass
 Graham Moore – drums, percussion 
 Jeremy Larson – strings, string arrangements

Production 
 Daniel Mackenzie – producer, engineer 
 Gabriel Wilson – producer, engineer, album concept
 Chris Greely – engineer
 Aaron Knott – assistant engineer
 Craig Alvin – mixing
 Brad Blackwood – mastering
 Kiley Hill – project manager
 Nathan Grubbs – design, cover photography
 Daley Hake – photography
 Luke Sankey – photography

Charts

Album

Singles

Release history

References

2013 live albums
Bethel Music albums